Yin Xin may refer to:

 Yin Xin (painter), Chinese painter
 Ivy Yin or Yin Xin, Taiwanese actress